The Scotland national wheelchair rugby league team represents Scotland in wheelchair rugby league. They have competed at the World Cup, the European Championships and several tournaments within the British Isles, such as the Celtic Cup and Four Nations competitions.

History
In July 2012 Scotland took part their first international competition, the Four Nations, a round-robin tournament between England, Ireland, Scotland and Wales. The tournament was held as part of preparations for the world cup taking place the following year. At the 2013 World Cup Scotland finished sixth after suffered heavy defeats against Australia and France in their group matches and losing twice to Ireland who they played in an inter-group match and the fifth-place play-off. Scotland recorded their first win in 2014 against Wales in the Four Nations. In 2015 Scotland played Ireland in the first Celtic Cup which was contested over two matches but became an annual three-team round robin with the addition of Wales in 2016. At the European Championships in 2015 Scotland started well with wins over Ireland and Wales. They came third in the group table but ended in fourth place after losing a play-off against Ireland. Scotland finished 7th at the 2017 World Cup after losses to Italy and Spain. In April 2019 Scotland defeated Ireland 52–42 in the Celtic Cup to record their first win since 2015. At the 2021 World Cup Scotland failed to progress from the group stage after losses to the United States, France and Wales.

Squad

Competitive record

World Cup

Celtic Cup

Results

Records

Biggest win: 34–14 v. Wales (13 September 2014)
Biggest defeat: 2–154 v. France (6 July 2013)

Notes

References

External links

Parasports in Scotland
Rugby league in Scotland
National wheelchair rugby league teams